Audentius, meaning bold or courageous in Latin, may refer to:

 Audentius, Bishop of Toledo in 385–395 and possible author of De fide adversus haereticos.

 Audentius, bishop of Die (Gaul) in the 5th century, who carried the title of bishop of the Vocontii